The Overland Park Police Department is a local police department in Kansas and is located in Johnson County, Kansas. The department was known as Mission Township Police Department prior to 1960.

History
The Overland Park Police Department (OPPD) was formed in 1960 when the Mission Township Police Department disbanded and became the Overland Park Police Department. The department was also formed when Overland Park became a "first class city".

Tragedy first affected the Overland Park Police Department on January 19, 1968, when a Kansas Highway Patrol Sergeant, Eldon K. Miller, was shot and killed in Overland Park. The incident began with a bank robbery in Overland Park. During the robbery, an Overland Park Police motorcycle officer was wounded, and the suspects were then found in an apartment complex when officers found the getaway vehicle used in the robbery. Following the discovery, officers set up a perimeter around the apartment complex and Trooper Miller hopped in a Johnson County Sheriff's Office patrol car and used the patrol car to cover other officers from gunfire. As he was moving the vehicle, the suspects started shooting and gunfire hit Trooper Miller in the head, killing him immediately. The suspects were arrested and sent to prison.

Two Overland Park officers have been killed in the line of duty. Officer Deanna S. Rose was killed on January 6, 1985, when she was in the process of attempting to arrest 19-year-old Kenneth Meunier for drunk driving. As she tried to arrest him, he knocked her down, got in his car, and ran her over; she died two days later. He was later arrested for the crime and went to prison, but was eventually released. She was the first female police officer killed in the state of Kansas. The second was on May 4, 2020, when Officer Michael Mosher was killed after he witnessed a hit and run and pursued the vehicle involved. Following a brief chase, Officer Mosher and the suspect exchanged gunfire, and both died as a result.

Shooting of John Albers
On January 20, 2018, OPPD Officer Clayton Jennison shot and killed 17-year-old John Albers while he was investigating a call in which Albers was threatening to commit suicide. Friends of Albers, who were concerned about his health and safety, called 911 to report that John was threatening to harm himself. When the officers arrived, they waited outside of the house for a few minutes before waiting for other officers before approaching. Officer Jennison parked down the street, walked up to the house, walked in the front yard, and was approaching the garage door when it began to open. John had opened the garage and was backing out of his garage in his mom's Honda Odyssey minivan when Officer Jennison felt that his life was in danger and fired two rounds from his department-issued sidearm. However, the van then did a 180-degree turn somewhat in reverse, and then Officer Jennison fired 11 more rounds, having fired 13 rounds total. The van then rolled down the driveway and into the street before stopping across the street in another house's front yard. Officers then approached the van to give aid to John following the shooting, but the injuries would prove to be fatal. John Albers was declared dead on the scene and had been shot multiple times by Officer Jennison. Officer Jennison would be cleared in the shooting by the Johnson County District Attorney, Steve Howe, who said the officer acted within Kansas Law when he opened fire. Officer Jennison, however, would leave the department following a payout that was negotiated for an $81,040 buyout, which included $70,000 for severance pay and an additional $11,040 for his regular salary. Following the shooting, the OPPD updated their policy in regards to firing at moving vehicles in order to hopefully prevent a similar incident from happening again. John's mother, Sheila Albers, filed a federal lawsuit following the shooting, which was settled with the city in 2019 for $2.3 million. The FBI also started an investigation into the shooting. OPPD Chief Frank Donchez has also been criticized by Sheila Albers due to his handling of the incident, which she claims involved him protecting "bad policing" and that he had "misled the public". However, following an investigation by the Kansas Commission on Police Officers Standards and Training (CPOST), Sheila Albers was told that no action would be taken against Chief Donchez. Sheila Albers has called it "shameful" that no action was taken against Donchez. In April 2021, the city of Overland Park released a 500-page document which showed pictures of evidence, crime scene, dashcam, and more information in regards to the shooting of John Albers.

Divisions
 Communications
 Investigations
 Traffic Unit
 Tactical Response (SWAT)
 School resource officers
 Diving Unit
 Fingerprinting
 Community Policing
 Explorers Program
 Citizen's Police Academy

Current duty equipment
 Glock Model 17 Gen 5 9mm 
 Glock Model 19 9mm (preferred by detectives and command staff. Some officers can carry it if they prefer the more compact pistol over the full size Model 17)
 Taser
 Pepper Spray
 ASP, Inc. Baton 
 Daniel Defense CQBR 5.56x45mm - Replaced CZ Scorpion Evo in service with SWAT
 Benelli M1 12 Gauge- replaced Remington 870 
 Daniel Defense AR-15 5.56×45mm NATO Patrol Rifle - replaced the Rock River Arms AR-15 previously in use.

Previous duty equipment
 Glock Model 22 .40 S&W- was replaced in 2020 by the Glock Model 17 as the standard sidearm for patrol officers. The Glock Model 22  had been in service since the early 2000s (approx. 2001–2002). The agency used the Gen 3 model up until around 2011 before going to the Gen 4 model.
 Glock Model 23 .40 S&W- was replaced in 2020 by the Glock Model 19 as the weapon for command staff, detectives and officers who prefer the more compact size pistol rather than carry the full size Glock. Like the Glock Model 22 it was in service since the early 2000s. The agency used the Gen 3 model up until around 2011 before going to the Gen 4 model.
 Beretta 92 9mm- was replaced by the Glock Model 22 as the standard sidearm in the early 2000s. It had been in service for about 8–10 years and was issued out with 2 spare 15 round magazines.
 Heckler & Koch MP5 9mm- was used by the SWAT unit for over 20 years before being replaced a few years ago by the CZ Scorpion Evo 3.
 Remington 870 12 Gauge- was used as a patrol shotgun before being replaced by the newer Benelli M3 shotguns. It was also used by SWAT in the 1980s and 1990s with a top folding stock to be more versatile for the needs of the SWAT unit.
 Taser Model X26- was used but was replaced by a newer model of Taser.

Vehicles 
 Ford Explorer (current)- The agency also has a few 2020 Explorer's purchased in addition to the 2014-2019 model years also in use.
 Dodge Durango (purchased in 2019 as an alternative to the Ford Explorer)
 Ford Taurus (being phased out, was used but officer's preferred the more space in the Explorer)
 Ford Crown Victoria (being phased out, mainly used by Traffic Units)
 Lenco BearCat (Tactics Team)

References

Overland Park, Kansas
Municipal police departments of Kansas